Carlo Borella was an Italian architect of the 17th century.  He designed churches in Vicenza and is thought to have been the architect responsible for the completion of Palladio's  Palazzo Chiericati.

One of Borella more notable works is the church at Monte Berico, Vicenza. Completed between 1688 and 1703 Borella is forsakes the Palladian influences of most Vicentine architecture in favour of the more modern and ornate Baroque.

References 
The Sanctuary of "Monte Berico" ( Vicenza, Veneto, Italy) retrieved 20 November 2006

17th-century Italian architects
Year of death unknown
Year of birth unknown
Architects from Vicenza